Archbishop Herman, born Grigory Sadyrev-Polev in Staritsa, was an archbishop of Kazan from 1564 to 1567, and later a candidate for the Metropolitan of Moscow. He died on November 6 1567 in Moscow and was buried in the Church of Saint Nicholas the Hospitable. He was the twelfth Metropolitan in Moscow to be appointed without the approval of the Ecumenical Patriarch of Constantinople as had been the norm.

Biography 
Herman took monastic vows in Joseph-Volokolamsk Monastery. Here he served under Hegumen Guriy, who would become the first archbishop of Kazan, and was engaged in copying books. Upon organizing his congregation in Kazan, St. Guriy called for Herman and appointed him head of Bogoroditsky Monastery in Sviyazhsk. The Russian Orthodox Church attached great importance to this monastery in terms of spreading Christianity among the non-Russians in the Kazan region. Upon Guriy's death in 1564, Herman was elected his successor. At the insistence of Ivan the Terrible and against Herman's will, he was appointed Metropolitan of Moscow in 1566. When the Tsar seized land from the aristocrats and imposed repression in a policy called the Oprichnina, Herman demanded the Tsar to abolish it. Herman was banished from Moscow in disgrace for this opposition.

Herman died in Moscow in 1567. His relics were then transported to Sviyazhsk, where they are resting to this day in Bogoroditsky Monastery. The Russian Church celebrates his memory on 6 November and 23 July (the day his relics were transferred from Moscow to Sviyazhsk).

References 

1568 deaths
Metropolitans of Kiev and all Rus' (Patriarchate of Moscow)
Russian saints
16th-century Christian saints
Year of birth unknown